Maulazzo Lake is a lake in the Province of Messina, Sicily, Italy. At an elevation of 1400 m, its surface area is 0.05 km².

Lakes of Sicily